Cerro del Diablo (Spanish for devil's peak) is a mountain in the municipality of Ponce, Puerto Rico, located north-northwest of the city of Ponce. The 2,234-foot high hill sits at the foothills of the Cordillera Central and is located in Barrio Tibes.

Location and geology
The hill is part of the Cordillera Central and is located north-northwest of Ponce in Barrio Tibes. It is located at coordinates 18° 06' 12", -66° 38' 05". Rio Portugues borders the mountain to the west.

Best view and road access
The best road for access to the top of the hill is PR-503.

References

Mountains in Ponce, Puerto Rico